ISF may stand for:

Science and technology
Interstitial fluid
Imaging Science Foundation
Incremental sheet forming
Information Security Forum, an international information security best practices organization
Ingenieurs Sans Frontieres (Engineers Without Borders)
Ink Serialized Format, a vector image file format from Microsoft
Israel Science Foundation

Education
Idries Shah Foundation, educational charity
Independent Schools Foundation Academy, private international school in Hong Kong
 Insaf Student Federation, it is the largest Center-Left Student organization in the Nation and the official student wing of the Pakistan Tehreek-e-Insaf political party
International School of Florence
International School Sport Federation, sports governing body for high school sport
Internationale Schule Frankfurt Rhein-Main

Sport
International Snowboard Federation
International Softball Federation
International Skyrunning Federation, world sports governing body for skyrunning
International Socca Federation, governing body of small-sided-football
International Sumo Federation, governing body for amateur sumo

Other
Importer Security Filing
Impôt de Solidarité sur la Fortune, a French wealth tax
International Seafarers' Federation, former international trade secretariat
Idaho Shakespeare Festival, theater company
Île Sans Fil, a community wireless network based in Montreal, Canada
Internal Security Forces, of Lebanon
Iraqi security forces
Lexus IS F
Italian Strategic Fund